Ruben Östlund  (born 13 April 1974) is a Swedish filmmaker best known for his black comedic and satirical films Force Majeure (2014), The Square (2017) and Triangle of Sadness (2022), all of which received largely positive reviews and won awards at the Cannes Film Festival, including the Palme d'Or for the latter two. His English-language debut Triangle of Sadness received critical acclaim and earned him Academy Award nominations for Best Director and Best Original Screenplay, with the film itself being nominated for Best Picture.

Life and career 
Östlund was born in Styrsö, Gothenburg Municipality, Sweden. After high school, he started working in various ski resorts in the Alps during the winter seasons. While in the Alps, he began making skiing videos for his friends, which helped him obtain a job at a local production company.

He went on to study at the film school in Gothenburg, graduating in 2001. He was accepted to the school based on his skiing films. Together with film producer Erik Hemmendorff, he is the co-founder of the production company Plattform Produktion, which produces his films.

His first three feature-length fiction films were The Guitar Mongoloid (2004), Involuntary (2008) and Play (2011). The Guitar Mongoloid won the FIPRESCI Award at the 27th Moscow International Film Festival. Östlund's short film Incident by a Bank won the Golden Bear for Best Short Film at the 60th Berlin International Film Festival and the Grand Prix at Tampere Film Festival in 2011.

In 2014, his film Force Majeure was selected to compete in the Un Certain Regard section at the Cannes Film Festival, winning the Jury Prize. Sweden then submitted Force Majeure for the Academy Award for Best Foreign Language Film. After the Academy shortlisted but did not nominate it, Östlund released a humorous video of his response to missing the nomination list. In 2016, he was a member of the jury for the Un Certain Regard section of Cannes.

In 2017, his film The Square, loosely inspired by some of his own experiences and art installation with Kalle Boman, competed at the Cannes Film Festival, where it ultimately won the Palme d'Or.

In 2020, he received the King's medal in gold for significant efforts in Swedish film.

Afterwards, he pursued the project Triangle of Sadness, a satirical film about the wealthy elite, winning his second Palme d'Or in 2022.

On January 23, 2023, he won Best Director at the Guldbaggens gala for Triangle of Sadness. The film won five other nominations.

In January of the same year, only a day after winning the Guldbaggengala, Triangle of Sadness received Academy Award nominations for Best Picture, Best Director, and Best Original Screenplay.

Personal life 
Östlund has been in a relationship with fashion photographer Sina Görcz since 2014 and has a son called Elias. He was previously married to his director colleague Andrea Östlund. They divorced in 2008 and have twin daughters, Alva and Hilda, together. Östlund was 28 when he became a father for the first time and was working on The Guitar Mongoloid, his first feature film.

Filmography

Awards and nominations

Academy Awards

BAFTA Awards

Golden Globe Awards

Notes

References

External links 

 
 
 Ruben Östlund at the Danish Film Institute
 Ruben Östlund at the British Film Institute 
 Plattform Produktion official website
 Plattform Produktion at YouTube
 Ruben Östlund at Instagram

1974 births
Living people
Best Director Guldbagge Award winners
Best Screenplay Guldbagge Award winners
Directors of Palme d'Or winners
European Film Award for Best Director winners
European Film Award for Best Screenwriter winners
Swedish male screenwriters
People from Gothenburg
Swedish cinematographers
Swedish directors
Swedish film directors
Swedish film editors
Swedish film producers
Swedish filmmakers
Swedish satirists
Swedish screenwriters